James Patrick Toomey (born December 26, 1960) is an American cartoonist famous for his comic Sherman's Lagoon. Toomey received his B.S.E. from Duke University's Pratt School of Engineering in 1983, an M.L.A. from Stanford University in 1995, and a Master's of Environmental Management from the Nicholas School of the Environment and Earth Sciences in 2008.

His cartoon strip, Sherman's Lagoon, is distributed by King Features Syndicate, and appears in over 250 newspapers in North America and in over 30 foreign countries.

Creative works
Lunch Wore a Speedo - Oct. 2014
Here We Go Again - Oct. 2013
Think Like a Shark - Sep. 2012
Never Bite Anything That Bites Back - Sep. 2011
Discover Your Inner Hermit Crab - Sep. 2010
Confessions of a Swinging Single Sea Turtle - Sep. 2009
Sharks Just Wanna Have Fun - Sep. 2008
Yarns and Shanties - Sep. 2007
Planet of the Hairless Beach Apes - Sep. 2006
In Shark Years I'm Dead - March 2006
A Day at the Beach - March 2005
Surfer Safari - Sep. 2005
Catch of the Day - Sep. 2004
Shark Diaries - Sep. 2003
A Lagoa de Sherman - Sep. 2003 (Spanish)
Le Lagon de Sherman - Sep. 2003 (French)
Greatest Hits & Near Misses - Sep. 2002
Surf's Up - March 2003
Greetings From Sherman's Lagoon - Sep 2002
Another Day in Paradise - Sep 2001
An Illustrated Guide to Shark Etiquette - Sep 2000
Poodle: The Other White Meat - Sep 1999
Ate That, What's Next? - Sep. 1997
Lagunen - Sep. 1996 (Norwegian)
Sigges Lagun - Sep. 1994 (Swedish)
50 Ways to Save the Ocean (illustrator; written by David Helvarg)

References

External links

 Sherman's Lagoon website
 Jim Toomey website
 TED Talk - April 2010
  Ocean Inspiration: 100-Second Tribute to Jacques Cousteau
 UNEP Video: Climate Change
 UNEP Video: The True Value of Our Oceans
 UNEP Video: Marine Litter
 UNEP Video: Blue Carbon
 UNEP Video: Nutrient Runoff
 UNEP Video: Adaptation to Sea Level Rise

1960 births
American comic strip cartoonists
Living people
Duke University Pratt School of Engineering alumni
People from Alexandria, Virginia